The 1951–52 Chicago Black Hawks season was the team's 26th season in the NHL, and they were coming off of a horrible season in 1950–51, when they finished with an NHL worst record of 13–47–10, earning 36 points, as Chicago missed the playoffs for the fifth straight season.  The Black Hawks ended the 1950–51 season winning only two of their last 43 games. In 1951–52, Chicago finished marginally better, but did not qualify for the playoffs.

Off-season
In the off-season, the Black Hawks were involved in the largest cash deal at the time, as they gave the Detroit Red Wings $75,000 in exchange for Jim McFadden, George Gee, Jimmy Peters, Clare Martin, Clare Raglan and Max McNab.

Regular season
The Black Hawks started the season off playing .500 hockey through their opening eight games, as they sat with a 3–3–2 record, however, the team fell into a five-game losing streak, and quickly fell out of playoff contention.  Chicago would slump all season long, ending up in last place in the league for the second consecutive season with a 17–44–9 record, earning 43 points, which was a seven-point improvement on the previous season.

In an early season matchup (November 24) against the Detroit Red Wings at the Detroit Olympia, Black Hawks captain Jack Stewart made his return to the team after missing nearly a year of action due to a back injury.  The Black Hawks defeated the powerful Red Wings 6–2 in his return. The following night in Chicago, Chicago goaltender Harry Lumley suffered a minor knee injury. Team trainer Moe Roberts, who had first played in the NHL in 1925–26 with the Boston Bruins, and had not played in the league since 1933–34 with the New York Americans, was an emergency third period replacement in goal for Chicago. Roberts stopped every shot he faced to help the Hawks win the game.

With the team having some attendance problems, the Black Hawks decided to experiment with afternoon games, and it worked, as on January 20, 1952, the Hawks had a season high crowd of 13,600 in a game against the Toronto Maple Leafs.

Black Hawks forward Bill Mosienko set an NHL record during Chicago's final game of the season at Madison Square Garden in New York, as he scored 3 goals on New York Rangers goaltender Lorne Anderson in 21 seconds as Chicago defeated New York 7–6.

Offensively, Bill Mosienko led the team with 31 goals and 53 points, while newly acquired George Gee had a club high 31 assists, and finished second in team scoring with 49 points.  Al Dewsbury led the Black Hawks blueline, scoring 7 goals and earning 24 points, while posting a team high 99 penalty minutes, while fellow defenceman Bill Gadsby also had a solid season, scoring 7 goals, registering 22 points and accumulated 87 penalty minutes.

In goal, Harry Lumley played in all 70 games, winning 17 of them, while posting a GAA of 3.46, and earning 2 shutouts.

Season standings

Record vs. opponents

Schedule and results

Regular season

Player statistics

Scoring leaders

Goaltending

References
 Hockey-Reference
 National Hockey League Guide & Record Book 2007

Chicago Blackhawks seasons
Chicago Black Hawks season, 1951-52
Chicago